Nikola Brkić (born 1 September 1998) is a professional water polo player of Montenegro.
Brkić started his career at PVK Jadran.

Junior team success
With junior team of PVK Jadran , he won tournaments such as Montenegrin first league and Montenengrin cup, Adriatic tournament Olympics hope, Adriatic tournament Final 10. With junior national team of Montenegro, he won gold medal on tournament "4 nations" in Bečej, gold medal on tournament in Szentes , silver medal on tournament "Darko Čukić" in Belgrade, and was part of the Montenegrin team at the 2015 European Games in Baku.

Teams
PVK Jadran 2014 - 2021

ANO Glyfada 2021 - 2022

Miskolci VLC 2022 -

Trophies with clubs
Season 2014-2015 - Montenegrin First League of Water Polo - Champions, Montenegrin Water Polo Cup - Champions

Season 2018-2019 - Montenegrin First League of Water Polo - Champions, Montenegrin Water Polo Cup - Champions, 2018–19 LEN Euro Cup 2nd place

Season 2019-2020 - Montenegrin First League of Water Polo - Champions, Montenegrin Water Polo Cup - Champions

Season 2020-2021 - Montenegrin First League of Water Polo - Champions, Montenegrin Water Polo Cup - Champions

References

1998 births
Living people
Montenegrin male water polo players
Water polo players at the 2015 European Games
European Games competitors for Montenegro
People from Kotor